This is a list of business and finance podcasts.

Entries are ordered by their released dates of the first episode.

List 
Business Daily
World Business Report

1983 
In Business (February)

1989 
Marketplace

1994 
Wake Up to Money (March)

2006 
EconTalk (16 March)
Wallstrip (16 October)

2008 
Planet Money (6 September)

2009 
This Week in Startups (1 May)
Freakonomics Radio (1 June)

2010 
Employee of the Month

2012 
Listen Money Matters

2016 
The Disruptive Entrepreneur (2 February)
50 Things That Made the Modern Economy (5 November)

2017 
Masters of Scale (3 May)
Equity Mates Investing Podcast

2019 

 Get Started Investing
Sustainable Organizations

References 

Lists of podcasts